The 2000–01 Canadian network television schedule indicates the fall prime time schedules for Canada's major English broadcast networks. For schedule changes after the fall launch, please consult each network's individual article.

2000 official fall schedule

Sunday

Monday

Tuesday

Wednesday

Thursday

Friday

Saturday

References

External links 

2000 in Canadian television
2001 in Canadian television
Canadian television schedules